Vincenzo Tommasone (born 30 June 1995) is an Italian footballer who plays as a forward for Serie D side Rieti.

Club career

Youth career
Born in Cassino, in the region of Lazio, Tommasone started his career at Molisan club A.C. Venafro. He was then signed by Serie A club Lazio in 2009. Tommasone was a member of Lazio's  under-15 team during the 2009–10 season. In summer 2012, he returned to the Molise region, signing for Sesto Campano, before leaving for Serie A club Internazionale on 30 August, initially in a temporary deal. He was signed by Inter outright in July 2013.

Inter and loaning out
On 2 September 2013, Tommasone was sold to fellow Serie A club Genoa in a co-ownership deal, with Michael Ventre moving in the opposite direction. The 50% registration rights of Tommasone was sold for €1.75 million and Ventre's 50% rights was acquired by Inter for €1.82 million, making the deal involved €70,000 cash only. Tommasone played for Genoa's reserve team in the 2013–14 season. He remained as one of the four overage players of the team in the first half of the 2014–15 season. He moved to the Italian-speaking part of Switzerland, joining FC Lugano in the second half of the season, making his senior debut in the 1. Liga Classic for their reserve team.

In June 2015, Inter bought back Tommasone for €900,000 on a 2-year contract, with Ventre returning to Genoa also for €900,000. Tommasone only played once for the first team in the Trofeo San Nicola, a friendly tournament. He wore the number 26 shirt.

On 8 January 2016, Tommasone was signed by Lega Pro club Paganese. On 31 August, he moved to Lega Pro newcomers Reggina on loan, along with Andrea Romanò (loan) and Christian Silenzi (outright).

On 31 August 2017, he joined Serie C club Santarcangelo on loan.

On 17 July 2018, he was loaned to Serie C club Rieti for one year.

On 2 September 2019, he joined Carpi on a one-year loan.

Post-Inter
In October 2020, Tommasone was signed by Serie D club F.C. Matese. He made two substitute appearances, scoring one goal for the club, before re-joining former side Rieti on a permanent deal in January 2021.

References

External links
 

Italian footballers
S.S. Lazio players
Inter Milan players
Genoa C.F.C. players
Paganese Calcio 1926 players
Reggina 1914 players
Santarcangelo Calcio players
Serie C players
Association football forwards
People from Cassino
Footballers from Molise
1995 births
Living people
F.C. Rieti players
A.C. Carpi players
A.S.D. Football Club Matese players
Footballers from Lazio
Sportspeople from the Province of Frosinone